Tedder is a surname. Notable people with the surname include: 

Arthur Tedder, 1st Baron Tedder, British air marshal
Constant Tedder, former Chief Executive Officer of Jagex Games Studio
Ernest Tedder (1915–1972), English cricketer
Henry Richard Tedder (1850–1924), English librarian
John Tedder, 2nd Baron Tedder, professor of Chemistry
Richard Tedder, English virologist and microbiologist
Ryan Tedder (born 1979), American singer-songwriter
Thomas Tedder, American immunologist

See also
Tedder, Florida
Tedder (machine), used in hay making
Teder, surname